Roman Turovsky-Savchuk (Ukrainian: Роман Туровський-Савчук) is an American artist-painter, photographer and videoinstallation artist, as well as a lutenist-composer, born in Ukraine. His musical works were published under various pseudonyms, including Johann Joachim Sautscheck.

Biography
Turovsky was born in Kyiv, Ukraine in 1961, when it was part of the Soviet Union.  He studied art from an early age under his father, the painter Mikhail Turovsky and at the Shevchenko State Art School in Kyiv. He also began to be interested in music in his teens.  The family emigrated to New York City in 1979.  They first lived in the Bronx. Turovsky continued his art studies in New York at the Parsons School of Design, studying concurrently Historical Performance (Baroque Lute) and Composition, under Patrick O'Brien, Pier Luigi Cimma, Leonid Hrabovsky and Davide Zannoni.

During the early 1990s, he worked at NYANA, a refugee resettlement agency in New York City (his co-workers there included people now prominent in the arts: theatre director Alexander Gelman, writer and director Todd Solondz, and writers Alex Halberstadt and Gary Shteyngart).

Art
Turovsky began composing in the early 1990s, simultaneously embarking on a career as a prolific artist-painter.  He participated in many exhibitions. His first one-man show was held in June 2006 in New York, and the second in February 2013.  Eight of his paintings are in the permanent collection of the International Marian Institute at the University of Dayton.

Cinema and television

Turovsky worked as a scenic artist in the production of Jim Jarmusch's film "Ghost Dog", Paul Schrader's "First Reformed", David Bowie's Blackstar as well as in Tom DiCillo's "Double Whammy" and other films. He is a member of United Scenic Artists.

Music
As a composer, Turovsky concentrated on the instrumental idiom of the Baroque lute and the torban, as well as viola da gamba and carillon. He composed over 1100 instrumental and vocal works influenced by his Ukrainian heritage and the baroque. Many of these were premiered by Luca Pianca at several international festivals (Salamanca, Lisbon, Schwetzingen, Vilnius, Vicenza, Urbino, Metz and Paris), Roland Ferrandi in Corte, Simon Paulus at Wolfenbüttel and Jindřich Macek in Přibyslav, Kraty, Prague and Hvar. He also collaborated with Paulo Galvão and Hans Kockelmans in a series of experimental works which they jointly composed.  His works have been performed/recorded by Robert Barto, Robert MacKillop, Oleg Timofeyev, Massimo Marchese, John Schneiderman, Thomas Schall, Trond Bengtson, Terrell Stone, Christopher Wilke and Bernhard Hofstötter on lute, Angelo Barricelli and Fernando Lewis de Mattos on guitar, Ernst Stolz on viola da gamba, as well as Hans Kockelmans and Olesya Rostovskaya on carillon. In 2011 and 2013 Turovsky was profiled in two 1 hour-long programs on the Dutch Classical radio-station Concertzender. He also composed over 40 tombeaux dedicated to various cultural figures. These were described by Pablo del Pozo as being of "unquestionable musical quality".

As a performer, Turovsky-Savchuk appeared as a lute soloist and continuo player in the Early Music line-up of Julian Kytasty's "New York Bandura Ensemble" and "Radio Banduristan". Roman Turovsky was a recipient of the 2008 NYSCA grant for the purpose of study of kobzar art with Julian Kytasty.

Roman Turovsky-Savchuk is a founding member of Vox Saeculorum and The Delian Society, two international groups devoted to the preservation and perpetuation of tonal music. He was described as composer-extraordinaire by the British author Suhayl Saadi.

In 2011 Turovsky-Savchuk contributed the soundtrack to the Iryna Korpan's documentary "She Paid The Ultimate Price", and in 2013 to the Marko Robert Stech's Georgy Narbut episode in the KontaktTV Toronto (OMNI TV (Canada)) series "Eyes on Culture" No.55.

Discography
 Massimo Marchese - "Dialogues with Time" (daVinci Edition C00028, 2017)
 Christopher Wilke "De Temporum Fine Postludia II" (Polyhymnion CD002, USA 2019)
 Christopher Wilke "De Temporum Fine Postludia" (Polyhymnion CD001, USA 2016)
 Daniel Shoskes "Weiss Undercover" (USA, 2016)
 Daniel Shoskes "Lautenschmaus" CD (USA, 2011)
 Angelo Barricelli "From Borderlands" (Lira Classica, Italy, 2008)
 Thomas Schall "Die Laute im Barock" LCCD 0202 (The Lute Corner, Switzerland, 2002)

Allonyms and pseudonyms

Since 1996 Turovsky has signed his musical works as Sautscheck, a German transliteration of the second part of his surname as an allonym. Turovsky used a variety of constructions, such as Johann Joachim and Konradin Aemilius, for first names attached to Sautscheck.  He represented the works as newly discovered manuscripts by supposed 17th-, 18th- and 19th-century composers from several generations of the same family.

His works for lute achieved wide circulation under the allonym of Sautscheck and the pseudonyms "Ioannes Leopolita" and "Jacobus Olevsiensis".  Musicologist Douglas Alton Smith perceived these works as malicious hoaxes and forgeries because of their ostensibly baroque or earlier styles. The controversy in 2000 over what some considered an outright hoax led to coinage of a new German word, Sautscheckerei, which denoted a musical or literary hoax.

Turovsky published Mikrokosmos, a collection of nearly 800 Renaissance-style pieces based on Ukrainian folk melodies under the pseudonyms "Ioannes Leopolita" and "Jacobus Olevsiensis"..

Literary activities

Turovsky's poetry translations (from Russian, Ukrainian, Polish and other languages) have appeared in the literary almanacs Cardinal Points, The Germ, and various web publications.
His translations of the early futurist works of Mykola Bazhan are included in the 2020 edition of Bazhan's "Quiet Spiders Of The Hidden Soul".

He also undertook research into the history of Torban, a Ukrainian musical instrument of the lute family, and wrote the chapter on it for the 2011 edition of "Die Laute in Europa".

References

External links
Early Music America, 2007 (summer issue), p. 43
, D. Dominick Lombardi interview for Huffington Post
"Roman Turovsky", EAM interview, Polyhymnion
"Roman Turovsky", Delian Society Website
"Lenten Meditation 5", Marian Meditations, University of Dayton
Turovsky
Scharffeneck collection of Contemporary Early Music – Turovsky

1961 births
Living people
Artists from Kyiv
20th-century classical composers
21st-century classical composers
20th-century American painters
American male painters
21st-century American painters
21st-century American male artists
Jewish American artists
Jewish American classical composers
Musicians from Kyiv
Ukrainian Jews
Jewish painters
American video artists
Composers for torban
Composers for lute
Composers for carillon
Postminimalist composers
American lutenists
Kobzarstvo
Torbanists
Parsons School of Design alumni
Pseudepigraphy
Ukrainian SSR emigrants to the United States
Ukrainian male painters
Ukrainian classical composers
Historicist composers
Musical hoaxes
Shevchenko State Art School alumni
21st-century American composers
Male classical composers
20th-century American composers
Jewish Ukrainian musicians
20th-century American male musicians
21st-century American male musicians
Vox Saeculorum
21st-century American Jews
Composers from New York City
Musicians from New York City
20th-century American male artists